Pleurobema taitianum, the heavy pigtoe or Judge Tait's mussel, was a species of freshwater mussel, an aquatic bivalve mollusk in the family Unionidae, the river mussels.

This species was endemic to the United States.

References

taitianum
Bivalves described in 1834
ESA endangered species
Taxonomy articles created by Polbot